An egg piercer pierces the air pocket of an eggshell with a small needle to keep the shell from cracking during hard-boiling.  If both ends of the shell are pierced, the egg can be blown out while preserving the shell (for crafts). Examples of egg piercers from the 19th century exist.

See also 

 List of egg dishes
 Shirred eggs
 Boiled egg

References 

Egg dishes